"Edith's 50th Birthday" (Parts 1 & 2) are the fourth and fifth episodes of the eighth season of the American television sitcom All in the Family. The episodes, which originally aired as a two-part one hour story on CBS on October 16, 1977, were written by Bob Schiller and Bob Weiskopf, and directed by Paul Bogart.

The episodes depict a man (David Dukes) who, while posing as a police detective, attempts to rape the Bunker family matriarch, Edith (Jean Stapleton), on her 50th birthday. This all happens while her family, unaware of what is happening in the Bunkers' living room, prepares for a surprise party next door (at the home of Gloria, Edith's daughter) to honor Edith. The scenes following the assault depict Edith struggling to deal with the aftermath, and her family's attempts to both comfort her and help bring her assailant to justice.

The episodes, the 161st and 162nd of the series, were the first on an American sitcom that portrayed an attempted rape.

Plot
On Edith Bunker's 50th birthday, her family plans a surprise party for her (though she, in fact, knows about the party and is in the process of baking her own birthday cake). As she waits alone in the house, a young man appears at the door, identifying himself as "Detective Lambert", and says he is searching for a rapist. He soon reveals that he is the rapist and tries to sexually assault Edith. When Archie appears to claim a punch bowl, the man hides in the closet and threatens to kill him and Edith if she says anything. Fearing for Archie's life, she shoos him out of the house. Once they are alone, the man begins tearing at Edith's clothes, but Edith buys time by saying she smells something burning in the kitchen. Edith's cake is in the oven and the man allows her to pull it out. She suddenly strikes him in the face with the burning cake, throws him out of the house, and runs over to Gloria and Michael's house, where the party is supposed to take place. As Edith's family and friends yell "Surprise!", she collapses, sobbing, into Archie's arms. 

She confides to her family what has happened, enraging Archie, who wants to go to the police. Edith refuses, however, wanting to forget it ever happened. Over the next two weeks, she descends into a state of constant fear and depression. Gloria urges her to identify the man to prevent him from assaulting other women. When Edith refuses, Gloria calls her out on how hypocritical she's being and says she no longer considers Edith her mother, and Edith slaps her. The shock of what she has just done snaps her out of her depression; after apologizing to Gloria, she agrees to identify her attacker to the police. She leaves for the police station with Archie, hoping that her actions will put the rapist in prison.

Production
"Edith's 50th Birthday" originally aired as a one-hour episode. In syndication, it is aired as a two-part episode.

Norman Lear consulted with Gail Abarbanel, the founder and director of the Rape Treatment Center at Santa Monica Hospital, and hosted advance screenings for police and hospitals across the country.

It was originally suggested that this storyline be written so that Ann Romano (portrayed by Bonnie Franklin) would be the one attacked on an episode of One Day at a Time. However, Lear changed it to Edith Bunker because he wanted to make a statement that this could happen to anyone, even someone as simple and naive as Edith.

The episode mentions events from the third season's "Gloria The Victim", in which Gloria was sexually assaulted while walking home from work. In that episode, Edith relates an incident where she herself had been the victim of an attempted date rape as a teenager in the 1940s, during a double date visit to Rockaway Beach, but due to the social norms of the time she had not pressed charges.

Response
The New York Police Department showed this episode, along with other films, to convey the woman's side of rape. It was also shown at rape crisis centers.

In 1996, TV Guide included this episode as part of its "100 Most Memorable Moments in TV History", ranking it # 64.

The scene where Edith uses the burnt cake to attack the rapist and then escape prompted the loudest cheers and applause from the studio audience in the history of the entire series. According to an interview in the E! True Hollywood Story, which covered All in the Family, David Dukes maintained that he received persistent death threats from some viewers for years for his character.

References

 McCrohan, Donna (1987). Archie & Edith, Mike & Gloria: The Tumultuous History of All in the Family. Workman Publishing. .

External links
St. Petersburg Times October 18 1977

All in the Family episodes
1977 American television episodes
Television episodes about rape
Emmy Award-winning episodes
Sitcom episodes
Obscenity controversies in television
Television controversies in the United States